Manuel Ardao Ferres (born 9 September 1998) is a Uruguayan rugby union player who generally plays as a hooker represents Uruguay internationally. He was included in the Uruguayan squad for the 2019 Rugby World Cup which is held in Japan for the first time and also marks his first World Cup appearance.

Career 
He made his international debut for Uruguay against Fiji on 17 November 2018.

References

External links

1998 births
Living people
Uruguayan rugby union players
Uruguay international rugby union players
Rugby union hookers
Rugby union players from Montevideo
Peñarol Rugby players
Rugby union flankers
People educated at Stella Maris College (Montevideo)